Głąbiński is a Polish masculine surname, its feminine counterpart is Głąbińska. It may refer to
August Franz Globensky (born Głąbiński; 1754–1830), Polish physician
Stanisław Głąbiński (1862–1941), Polish politician, academic, lawyer and writer

See also
Globensky

Polish-language surnames